Thomas Vano (born October 26, 1970 in Plainfield, New Jersey) is a former field hockey goalkeeper from the United States, who finished twelfth with the national squad at the 1996 Summer Olympics in Atlanta, Georgia.

References
 USA Field Hockey

External links
 

1970 births
Living people
American male field hockey players
Olympic field hockey players of the United States
Field hockey players at the 1996 Summer Olympics
Sportspeople from Plainfield, New Jersey